Twentyone Lake is a lake in Otter Tail County, in the U.S. state of Minnesota.

Twentyone Lake was so named from its location in section 21 of the county.

See also
List of lakes in Minnesota

References

Lakes of Otter Tail County, Minnesota
Lakes of Minnesota